The 2020 Asian Track Cycling Championships (40th edition) took place at the Jincheon National Training Center Velodrome in Jincheon, South Korea from 17 to 21 October 2019. Despite the event was planned for 2020, it is brought forward to October 2019 because of the 2020 Summer Olympics qualification timeline.

Medal summary

Men

Women

Medal table

References

External links
Website (in Korean)
Results – Track 
Results book

Asian Cycling Championships
Asian Track Cycling Championships
Asian Track Cycling Championships
International cycle races hosted by South Korea
Asian Cycling Championships